Bailhache, from Norman French  meaning to "give axe", perhaps used as an occupational surname for an executioner or a woodman, is a surname known from Jersey, England, and elsewhere. Notable people with this surname include:
  (born 1937), French painter
 Clement Bailhache (1856–1924), English lawyer and judge
 Jean Bailhache (1911–?), French author and translator
 John Bailhache (1787–1857), 10th mayor of Columbus, Ohio
 Sir Philip Bailhache (born 1946), Jersey politician and lawyer, Bailiff of Jersey (1994-2009)
 Robin Bailhache (born 1937), a former Australian Test cricket match umpire
 Sir William Bailhache (born 1953), Jersey lawyer, incumbent Bailiff of Jersey since 2015, brother of Philip Bailhache

References

External links

Occupational surnames